Raju Singh (Full name: Rajinder Singh Panesar) is an Indian film score composer, session musician, singer and a guitarist. His first collaboration was with Malkit Singh of Hai Jamalo fame. Together with Adesh Srivastav they released an album called I Love Golden Star which was quite a rage in the underground circles in Britain. Some of his early compositions include of shows are Dekh Bhai Dekh, Filmi Chakkar, Aahat, Boogie Woogie and CID.

Early life 
Rajinder Singh Panesar, aka Raju Singh, was born on 3 April 1969 in Mumbai, India. Son of Gursharan Kaur Panesar and Charanjit Singh Panesar; his father hails from Amritsar and Mother from Ferozepur, Punjab.

Singh's family lived in Juhu, Mumbai. He attended St. Xavier's High school, Vile Parle and completed college from Mithibai college in 1986. Raju Singh has been an integral part of the music industry from a very young age of 16 years when he would play the Bass guitar for the veteran music director R.D. Burman. Learning from the masters from such a young age has imbibed in Raju a deep understanding of the role of music in films. Singh's school friends remember him as a guitar and drummer boy. Singh did his first album an Instrumental Tracks Power Of Music with his friend Aadesh Shrivastav in the year 1987 under the label of Venus.

He attended Sangeet Mahabharati founded by Pt. Nikhil Gosh and Complete Theory of Trinity College of London. The first instrument he learned to play was the guitar, followed by tabla and piano. His guitar teachers were Mr. Bonny D’ Costa, Mr. Dilip Naik, Mr. Mendes and Mr. Das, Late Mr. Bismak . He learned Tabla from Late Mr. Eknath Pimpley and Late Mr. Prakash Gore. His Piano teacher was Mr. Mendes. Singh can play the Acoustic Guitar, Bass Guitar, Electric Guitar, Tabla and Piano.

Looking back to his childhood Singh says, "I used to accompany my dad to the studio and often watch him play with the likes of S D Burman, R D Burman & Laxmikant–Pyarelal, this created a strong desire to be one amongst them. After returning home I used to play in front of the mirror and dad used to secretly watch me and when I was done he used to appreciate my work. His words helped me build myself in music."

As a child, Singh used to accompany his teacher Mendes to an NGO near Worli every Sunday and they used to spend time playing different types of instruments with many other musicians. Singh says "This practice taught me an important lesson, the lesson of humility which proved to be useful in every walk of life.

Career 
As a musician, Singh started playing for Uttam Singh who introduced him as a guitarist for the song Mere Pyar Ki Umar for the movie Waaris, sung by Lata Mangeshkar and Manmohan. Initially he started off as a guitarist with R D Burman and had the honour to be a part of his last movie 1942: A Love Story then slowly progressed on to become an arranger, music director, composer and scorer for Bollywood movies later composing and directing for television and advertising. One of the famous hits is Soniyo from Raaz: The Mystery Continues, Gungunati Hain from Satta.

Discography

As a composer

Soundtracks

Albums

Film scores

As a singer

Others

Films

As composer for background score

Web Series/Short Film

Jingles Advertisement 

 Ashok Masala 
 Honda
 Hindutwa Newspaper
 T-Series Washing Powder 
 Praful Sarees
 Protection Toothpaste
 Baba Zarda 
 Shakti Company
 Rani Oil
 Wheel 
 Red Label Tea
 Tata Tetley Tea
 Bharat Petroleum
 Prestige Whisky 
 Afro Asian Games (2003)
 IIFA Awards
 Hello Chips 
 T-Series Concorde Fans
 Surya Namak
 Lizole Detergent
 Essel Premium Basmati Rice
 Ok Saboon
 Spirit Sanitary Packs
 Free Of Mind
 Add Gel
 Snuggy
 Doodh Doodh
 Coke – Hritik
 Xenon
 Cell One
 Veera (2002)
 Chaini Chaini
 Mehek Smiling Doll 
 Excotica

Channel Anthem 

 EL TV
 ZEE TV
 SONY TV
 Channel 9
 B4U
 SET Max
 GURJARI
 LASHKARA
 Sony Mix
 SAB

Personal life 
Singh is married to Sherley Singh with two children Joshua Singh and Rachel Singh. Joshua, also a musician, was a ukulele player and drummer for the band Spud in the Box from 2013 to 2017 and Rachel is currently studying at the Berklee College of Music in Boston, Massachusetts, United States.

His father Charanjit Singh Panesar was a musician who often played as a guitarist with R D Burman and his dad S D Burman. In 1982, armed with Roland gear, Singh set out to update the entrancing drone and whirling scales of classical Indian music with his record Ten Ragas to a DIsco Beat. After nearly three decades of near-complete obscurity, the album resurfaced when Bombay Connection label impresario Edo Bouman snapped it up while travelling in India. After which he has been given the title 'the father of Acid House’ for the album.

His mother Gursharan Kaur Panesar a housewife was a painter and an artist, with only one sibling, a younger sister, Jasleen Khanna.

Awards and nominations 

Singh and Aadesh Shrivastava received their first award together, The Gold Disc Award in the year 1988 for his album "golden star". 
2009, he was awarded Mirchi Music Award – Best background score for the movie ‘Raaz: The Mystery Continues’. He won The Indian Telly Awards for Best title music & background score for Sahib Biwi Ghulam & Amber Dhara in 2005 and 2008 respectively.
Recently he has achieved the 2015 PTC Punjabi Film Awards for the best background score for the movie "Punjab 1984" and The 2016 Golden Petal Award for background score – fiction Ashoka.

References

External links

Indian film score composers
Living people
1969 births